Mohamed Ali Haga is a Somali politician. He is the State Minister of Defence of Somalia, having been appointed to the position on 17 January 2014 by Prime Minister Abdiweli Sheikh Ahmed.

References

Living people
Government ministers of Somalia
1966 births